Kim Fupz Aakeson (born 12 September 1958, Copenhagen) is a Danish writer, illustrator and screenwriter.

Selected filmography

References

External links 
 
 

1958 births
20th-century Danish male writers
20th-century Danish writers
21st-century Danish writers
Danish children's writers
21st-century Danish illustrators
Danish male screenwriters
Living people
Writers from Copenhagen
Bodil Honorary Award recipients